The Peru women's national basketball team is the official women's basketball team for Peru. It is administrated by the Peru Basketball Federation (Spanish: Federación Deportiva Peruana de Basketball) (F.D.P.B.).

See also 
 Peru women's national under-19 basketball team
 Peru women's national under-17 basketball team
 Peru women's national 3x3 team

References

External links
 Peru at FIBA Americas
 Peru Basketball Records at FIBA Archive

Women's national basketball teams in South America
National team
Basketball teams in Peru
Basketball